The Chief of the General Staff of the Mozambique Defence Armed Forces (CEMFADM) is the highest-ranked officer in the Mozambique Defence Armed Forces.

Chief of Staff

References 

Army chiefs of staff
Military of Mozambique